Esoteric Escape is the debut studio album by Scottish rock and Electronic music band Keser.

Overview
Esoteric Escape was recorded in 2006 at the studio of Alex Tronic Records in Edinburgh, Scotland, and was produced by Paul Croan. The album features guitar-driven Electronic music and it is predominantly instrumental, with 3  exceptions, Lost for Days, In the Next Beginning and Frozen Fireworks. It consists mainly of Guitar, Bass, Keyboards and the use of various types of Drum Machine.

When questioned about the influences for the sound created on Esoteric Escape, the band have been quoted as saying

Track listing

 "FM Rocker" – 4:14
 "4_Cycles" - 5:06
 "Lost for Days" - 6:37
 "Page 20" - 2:50
 "In the Next Beginning" - 6:06
 " Rolling V2" - 4:57
 "Teach" - 4:21
 "Frozen Fireworks" - 5:51
 "Destination:Destiny" - 5:34
 "Page 21 (Reasons to Believe)" - 6:09
 "We are Closed on Every Tuesday" - 2:44
 "Kontrol/Kaos" - 5:41

Personnel
 Paul Croan - Producer, Arrangement
 Gavin Clark - Recorded "In the Next Beginning", "Rolling V2", and "Kontrol/Kaos" at Hidden Channel, Glasgow.
 David Reid - Bass
 Kevan Whitley - Guitar, Keyboards, Programming
 Geoff Allen - Mastering at CaVa Studios

Release history
Esoteric Escape was released in various countries in 2006 via UK label Alex Tronic Records. The label's distribution includes Cargo Records for the UK and Arabesque for the rest of the world.

Notes

Keser albums
2006 albums
Alex Tronic Records albums